Kachab Mahalleh (also Romanized as Kachab Maḩalleh; also known as Kachap Maḩalleh) is a village in Estakhr-e Posht Rural District, Hezarjarib District, Neka County, Mazandaran Province, Iran. At the 2006 census, its population was 971, in 193 families.

اهالی این روستا اکثرا سید می باشند  شغل بیشتر مردم کشاورزی و دامپروری و تولید گیاهان دارویی می باشد

این روستا داری نانوایی، خانه بهداشت یک عدد حسینیه، دوعدد مسجد، یک مجموعه فرهنگی در حال ساخت و یک بیمارستان درحال ساخت می باشد

درود بر مردم این روستا

References 

Populated places in Neka County